Mazi is a mountain in Kathikas in Paphos District. Is located at 683 m above sea level.

Topography 
Mazi, Paphos district is a mountain and is north of Lakkos tou Fragkou and south of Katsarkes. Mazi has an elevation of 683 metres, and is nearby to Ágios Geórgios and Ágios Agríppas.

Other 
Mazi is listed the 7th  highest mountain in Cyprus.

References

Paphos District
Mountains of Cyprus